Patrick Tierney (24 April 1904 – 29 September 1990) was an Irish Labour Party politician. A farmer before entering politics, he was elected to the 8th Seanad on the Labour Panel in 1954. He was elected to Dáil Éireann as a Labour Party Teachta Dála (TD) for the Tipperary North constituency at the 1957 general election. He was re-elected at the 1961 and 1965 general elections. He did not contest the 1969 general election.

References

1904 births
1990 deaths
Labour Party (Ireland) TDs
Members of the 8th Seanad
Members of the 16th Dáil
Members of the 17th Dáil
Members of the 18th Dáil
Politicians from County Tipperary
Labour Party (Ireland) senators